Benguet Corporation is a diversified Philippine business enterprise.

Background
Founded in 1903, the Benguet Corporation is the oldest mining company of the country.

Activities

The company is mainly active in the mining industry, yet has come to incorporate other activities including forestry/reforestation, chemical testing and research, ecotourism, trucking and warehousing, heavy equipment leasing, trading and real estate.

Incidents
In August 2016, the Benguet Corporation was facing a $500,000 fine for tailings leak from its old Antamok mine in Itogon, which resulted in the pollution of the Agno, Liang, and Ambalanga rivers. In September 2018, the trial against Benguet was still going on, the defense arguing that leaks were a result of natural causes and thus Benguet should not be held accountable for the heavy water pollution of the area.

In 2017, Benguet was also called for by the local media for being responsible of the polluting leaks affecting the Dizon mine. The company denied all implications, arguing it was only active at the mine from 1975 to 1995.

In September 2018, the Benguet Corporation was also facing claims that it was encouraging small-scale and illegal mining operations at the Itogon mine, officially inactive since 1990. The Itogon mine had just been hit a major landslide that caused 10 deaths and 50-60 missing persons. The Benguet Corporation denied encouraging the presence of the illegal gold diggers.

References

Mining companies of the Philippines
Companies based in Makati
Non-renewable resource companies established in 1903
Companies listed on the Philippine Stock Exchange
Philippine companies established in 1903